First team may refer to:

Sports
 First team (association football), the colloquial name given to the most senior team fielded by a football club
 The First Team, the first players known to have played the sport of basketball
 First Team All-American, a hypothetical American sports team composed of outstanding amateur players
 The first-choice lineup of players in a sports team who start the game

Arts and entertainment 
 The First Team (novel), a novel by John Ball
 The First Team (TV series), a British comedy television series
 First Team: Juventus, a 2018 American and Italian documentary

Military 
 US 1st Cavalry Division, whose nickname and motto bears 'first team'

Business 
 The business book The Five Dysfunctions of a Team promotes the concept of a first team